Lavender Peak is a high mountain summit in the La Plata Mountains range of the Rocky Mountains of North America. Lavender Peak was named in honor of Dwight Garrigues Lavender (1911-1934), the author of a 1932 climbing guide to the San Juan Mountains.

Mountain

Historical names
Lavendar Peak
Lavender Peak – 1976

See also

List of Colorado mountain ranges
List of Colorado mountain summits
List of Colorado fourteeners
List of Colorado 4000 meter prominent summits
List of the most prominent summits of Colorado
List of Colorado county high points

References

External links

Mountains of Colorado
Mountains of Montezuma County, Colorado
San Juan National Forest
North American 4000 m summits